Scopula spoliata is a moth of the  family Geometridae. First described by Francis Walker in 1861, it is found in Kenya, Malawi, Somalia, South Africa and Zambia.

References

Moths described in 1861
spoliata
Moths of Africa